Erdoğan Yeşilyurt (born 6 November 1993) is a German professional footballer who plays as a left winger for Sivasspor.

Career
Yeşilyurt is a youth product of the German sides TSC Euskirchen and Bonner SC. He began his senior career with Arminia Bielefeld in the 3. Liga in 2012, before going on loan to Eintracht Trier in 2013. In the summer of 2013, he transferred to MSV Duisburg, before moving to Turkey with Altınordu in 2014.

On 19 June 2018, Yeşilyurt transferred to the Süper Lig club Sivasspor.

Personal life
Born in Germany, Yeşilyurt is of Turkish descent.

Honours
Sivasspor
 Turkish Cup: 2021–22

References

External links
 
 
 

1993 births
Living people
People from Euskirchen
German people of Turkish descent
Sportspeople from Cologne (region)
German footballers
Footballers from North Rhine-Westphalia
Association football wingers
3. Liga players
Süper Lig players
TFF First League players
Arminia Bielefeld players
SV Eintracht Trier 05 players
MSV Duisburg players
Altınordu F.K. players
Sivasspor footballers